Nagamangala Assembly constituency is one of the 224 constituencies in the Karnataka Legislative Assembly of Karnataka a south state of India. It is also part of Mandya Lok Sabha constituency.

Members of Legislative Assembly

Mysore State
 1951: M. Shankaralinge Gowda, Independent

 1957: T. Mariappa, Indian National Congress

 1962: T. N. Madappa Gowda, Independent

 1967: K. Singari Gowda, Indian National Congress

 1972: T. N. Madappa Gowda, Indian National Congress

Karnataka State
 1978: H. T. Krishnappa, Janata Party

 1983: Chigarigowda, Independent

 1984 (By-Poll): H. T. Krishnappa, Independent

 1985: H. T. Krishnappa, Janata Party

 1989: L. R. Shivarame Gowda, Independent

 1994: L. R. Shivarame Gowda, Independent

 1999: N. Chaluvaraya Swamy, Janata Dal (Secular)

 2004: N. Chaluvaraya Swamy, Janata Dal (Secular)

 2008: Suresh Gowda, Indian National Congress

 2013: N. Chaluvaraya Swamy, Janata Dal (Secular)

 2018: Suresh Gowda, Janata Dal (Secular)

See also
 Mandya district
 List of constituencies of Karnataka Legislative Assembly

References

Assembly constituencies of Karnataka
Mandya district